Sir Graeme Bell Finlay, 1st Baronet, ERD ( – ), was a Conservative Party politician in the United Kingdom.

Finlay was son of James Bell Pettigrew Finlay, of Portskewett House, near Chepstow, an engineer, and his wife Margaret Helena, daughter of John Euston Davies. He was educated at Marlborough, and at University College London, then entered Gray's Inn in 1946, becoming a barrister.

He was elected at the 1951 general election as Member of Parliament (MP) for the Epping constituency in Essex. He was re-elected in 1955 and 1959, and held the seat until his defeat at the 1964 general election by the Labour candidate Stan Newens. 

On 31 December 1964 he was created a baronet, of Epping in the County of Essex.

Finlay married June Evangeline, daughter of Colonel Francis Collingwood Drake, in 1953. They had three children: a son and heir to the baronetcy, David, and two daughters, Fiona and Catrina.  Lady Finlay died on 19 October 2022.

References 

 

1917 births
1987 deaths
Conservative Party (UK) MPs for English constituencies
Ministers in the Macmillan and Douglas-Home governments, 1957–1964
People educated at Marlborough College
South Wales Borderers officers
Baronets in the Baronetage of the United Kingdom
UK MPs 1951–1955
UK MPs 1955–1959
UK MPs 1959–1964